The Finnenloipe Rothenthurm is a cross-country skiing trail in the high valley of Rothenthurm, Canton Schwyz in Switzerland. The trail is groomed for both skating and classic style. It begins at Rothenthurm railway station and leads through the Nordic-looking Rothenthurm high moor (hence the name Finnenloipe, English Finn's cross-country skiing trail), the largest contiguous high moor area in Switzerland. Several times it passes the Biber, one of the last freely meandering rivers in the Swiss Prealps. The entire circuit is 20 km, but can be shortened to 7, 11 or 15 km. In addition, there is a 3 km long night trail that is illuminated in the evening.

The trail is maintained by the Finnenloipe Rothenthurm association, which was founded on October 29, 1977.

References

External links 
 Official website

 Cross-country skiing in Switzerland